Emma Bridgewater is a British ceramics manufacturing company founded in 1985. Specialising in earthenware tableware. they are noted for their polka dot design among others. The company is one of the largest pottery manufacturers based entirely in the UK.

There are two Emma Bridgewater shops in London as well as an outlet store located at the company's factory in Hanley, Stoke-on-Trent.

History 

The company was founded by Emma Bridgewater when being unable to find a suitable cup and saucer for a gift she decided to create her own. Drawing four shapes, a mug, a bowl, a jug and a dish, samples were created in Stoke-on-Trent.

In its first year the company had a turnover of around £30,000. By 2009 this had increased to almost £8 million, and £11 million in 2010, employing 180 people.
According to their website, in 2022 around 230 people worked their factory and produce 1.7 million pieces annually.

Products 
Emma Bridgewater's pottery designs are also adapted for application onto textiles, glass, tin, stationery, and melamine. During a visit by Prince Andrew, Emma discussed the brand's launch of its biggest ever collection of Royal commemorative ware to celebrate the Queen's Diamond Jubilee in 2012.

"Festival in a Factory" 
For the last few years, the Emma Bridgewater factory in Stoke on Trent has been the home to the "Festival in a Factory" a 3-day literary festival where a number of authors, politicians, artists and celebrities give public lectures. The 2020 Festival, planned for 4–6 June, was cancelled as a result of the Covid-19 pandemic.

Recent speakers included: Mary Portas, Viv Groskop Elizabeth Day, Christopher Eccleston, Lauren Child, AN Wilson, historian Tom Holland, author Ben Macintyre, historian  Andrew Roberts, Rachel Reeves MP, Greepeace UK's Will McCallum, biographer Jenny Uglow, the National Trust's Nino Strachey, the V&A's Oriole Cullen and Claire Wilcox, and novelist Deborah Moggach.

Founder and owners
The company is named after Emma Rice, née Bridgewater, and is run by her and her husband Matthew Rice. 

In 2016, Emma was made President of the Campaign to Protect Rural England. She is also a Patron of the Heritage Crafts Association.

Matthew Rice also designs for the company, and he indulges his passion for birdlife in the Birds range.

Bibliography

References

External links 

 

Ceramics manufacturers of England
Companies based in Stoke-on-Trent
Manufacturing companies established in 1985
Staffordshire pottery
1985 establishments in the United Kingdom